Velež, named after the Slavic pagan god Veles, is a mountain in Bosnia and Herzegovina, located in the south-central part of the Herzegovina region, overlooking the largest regional city of Mostar.

The highest peak of Velež mountain is called Botin, and it is 1,969 meters high.

See also
List of mountains in Bosnia and Herzegovina

References

Mountains of Bosnia and Herzegovina